Shirley is Shirley Bassey's fourth studio album, her second for Columbia, and was recorded with Geoff Love and his orchestra. It was her first album to enter the top ten of the UK Albums Chart, a feat she would not duplicate until Something in 1970. This album was issued in mono and stereo. The stereo version of this album was issued on CD in 1997.

Track listing
Side one
 "In the Still of the Night" (Cole Porter) – 3:20
 "Let There Be Love" (Lionel Grant, Ian Rand) – 3:10
 "All At Once (Déjà)" (Dorcas Cochran, Emil Stern, Eddy Marnay) – 3:30
 "For Every Man There's a Woman" (Leo Robin, Harold Arlen) – 3:50
 "I'm in the Mood for Love" (Jimmy McHugh, Dorothy Fields) – 3:19
 "So In Love" (Cole Porter) – 3:01

Side two
 "If I Were a Bell" (Frank Loesser) – 2:51
 "There Will Never Be Another You" (Harry Warren, Mack Gordon) – 2:51
 "Hooray for Love" (Arlen, Robin) – 3:09
 "Too Late Now" (Alan Jay Lerner, Burton Lane) – 3:37
 "I'm Shooting High" (Ted Koehler, McHugh) – 2:19
 "Ev'ry Time We Say Goodbye" (Cole Porter) – 5:13

Personnel
 Shirley Bassey – vocal
 Geoff Love – arranger, conductor
 Geoff Love and his Orchestra - Orchestra

References 

Shirley Bassey albums
1961 albums
EMI Records albums
Columbia Records albums
Albums produced by Norman Newell
Albums conducted by Geoff Love
Albums arranged by Geoff Love